Georgy Elgudzhayevich Sulakvelidze (born 18 April 2001) is a Russian football player of Georgian descent. He plays for FC Dynamo Moscow.

Club career
He made his debut for FC Dynamo Moscow on 31 August 2022 in a Russian Cup game against FC Rostov.

Career statistics

References

External links
 
 
 
 

2001 births
Footballers from Moscow
Russian sportspeople of Georgian descent
Living people
Russian footballers
Association football midfielders
FC Dynamo Moscow players
Russian Second League players